Assam State Transport Corporation or ASTC is a state government owned road transport corporation of Assam, India which provides bus services within Assam and adjoining states. Assam State Transport was started as a state government department with four buses to run between Guwahati and Nagaon. Gradually the transport network of the department expanded throughout the state of Assam. The state transport department was converted to a corporation on 31 March 1970.

Services
ASTC is the lifeline of road transport connectivity of the state as it operates buses on highways, city roads and even in the remote rural areas. The present chairperson is Ashok Kumar Bhattarai. It operates a fleet of 585 buses including Hi-Tech Luxury (AC/Non AC) buses for long distances and Hi-Tech semi and mini deluxe bus services for city and rural areas. The subsidiary 
Assam State Urban Transport Corporation operates the city bus services within Guwahati city. There are also many private buses operating under ASTC. Apart from that the corporation also partnered with some private Volvo bus operators to operate on Public Private Partnership (PPP) mode. ASTC has 135 bus stations and 3 Inter State Bus Terminals (Guwahati, Jorhat and Silchar) across the state.

Types of services
 
Fleets
 AC Hi-Tech Luxury Coach
 Non AC Hi-Tech Luxury Coach
 Bharat Benz Coach
 Semi Deluxe Coach
 Tata Marcopolo City Service
 Volvo 8400 B7R LE Coach

PPP mode fleet
 Volvo Semi-Sleeper Coach

Divisions
ASTC has 10 traffic divisions across the state. These are - Tinsukia Division, Nagaon Division, Silchar Division, Jorhat Division, Sivasagar Division, Bongaigaon Division, Lakhimpur Division, Tezpur Division, Greater Guwahati Region City Service Division and ISBT-Guwahati Division.

Contribution
ASTC donated bus for the cancer patients of Assam. They had donated 20 BharatBenz buses to shift cancer patients from Assam to Tata Memorial Hospital, Mumbai

References

External links 
Assam State Transport Corporation

Bus companies of India
Transport in Assam
State road transport corporations of India
State agencies of Assam
Indian companies established in 1970
1970 establishments in Assam
Transport companies established in 1970